City Point of CityPoint may refer to:

United Kingdom
CityPoint, an office tower in London, England

United States
City Point (New Haven), a neighborhood in New Haven, Connecticut
 City Point, a section of the South Boston area in Boston, Massachusetts
 City Point (MBTA station), a transportation station in Boston
City Point (Brooklyn), a mixed-use real estate development in Downtown Brooklyn, New York
City Point, Virginia, an extinct town (now a portion of Hopewell, Virginia)
 City Point National Cemetery
 City Point Railroad
City Point, Wisconsin, a town in Jackson County
City Point (community), Wisconsin, an unincorporated community

See also
Citipointe (disambiguation)